Kočna at  high, is the second-highest mountain in the Kamnik–Savinja Alps and the westernmost peak of the Grintovec Range. Its prominent and easily recognized peak is visible from far around. The mountain has two peaks: the higher Jezersko Kočna (Jezerska Kočna) and the nearby lower Kokra Kočna.

Name
The oronym Kočna is derived from the Slovenian common noun kočna 'cirque', referring to a valley with an amphitheater-like head and also to the valley head itself with pastures and forests below the wall of a mountain, and was applied to the mountain via metonymy. The common noun kočna itself is derived from the Slavic root *kǫtъ 'corner'. The name Kočna is also found as a settlement name for the nearby village of Kočna and in the derived name Podkočna.

Starting points
 Zgornje Jezersko (889 m)
 Kamnik, Kamnik Bistrica (601 m)
 Kokra, Preddvor

Routes

 4½-5h: from Kokra: the Suhadolnik Route
 3¼h: from the Czech Lodge at Spodnje Ravni (1542 m): the Kremžar Route 
 3½h: from the Zois Lodge at Kokra Saddle (1793 m)
 1¾h: from the top of Mount Grintovec: the Šprem Route

References

External links

 Mount Kočna at Geopedia
 Jezersko Kočna Route Description and Photos. Hribi.net.

Mountains of the Kamnik–Savinja Alps
Two-thousanders of Slovenia